Guitar Songs is the second extended play (EP) by American singer-songwriter Billie Eilish. It was released digitally on July 21, 2022, by Darkroom and Interscope Records. The release came as a surprise, a decision that Eilish made because she wanted to share new music to her fans as soon as she could. A two-track EP, it was produced by her brother Finneas O'Connell, who wrote the songs with her.

The tracks in Guitar Songs feature Eilish's soft vocals over acoustic guitar instrumentation, with personal lyrics that derive from contemporary life events. She debuted its first one, "TV", during the Manchester concert of a 2022–2023 world tour in support of Happier Than Ever (2021), her second studio album. The song references the June 2022 overturning of Roe v. Wade. "The 30th", the EP's other track, was written in December 2021 after she witnessed a close friend survive a car accident. Both songs serve as singles from the EP. 

Music critics praised Guitar Songs for its vocal performances and songwriting—many believed that Eilish was able to prove her talent as a songwriter through the EP's lyricism. Its tracks entered several national record charts worldwide, including the Billboard Hot 100 in the US. The two reached the top 40 in four countries, as well as the top 50 of the Billboard Global 200. After the EP's release, Eilish and Finneas performed "TV" again and "The 30th" for the first time during the Asian leg of the world tour.

Background 
Happier Than Ever, the second studio album by American singer-songwriter Billie Eilish, was released on July 30, 2021. She started formulating ideas for her third studio album's songs with her brother Finneas O'Connell in December 2021. The first song that the two wrote after Happier Than Ever release was "The 30th", and they did so on December 30. Eilish decided on the title because on November 30 of that year, "something happened[...] and it had just been the most indescribable thing [she had] to witness and experience." After writing "The 30th", they wrote the song "TV". Finneas handled the production for both songs.

Eilish and Finneas wrote "TV" while the US Supreme Court was discussing the Dobbs v. Jackson Women's Health Organization case. A draft of the court decision leaked online in May 2022. The draft revealed plans to overturn Roe v. Wade, a landmark case which had made abortion a constitutional right in the country. Eilish, known for her history with political activism, was saddened by the leak, and she felt like her rights as a woman were getting stripped away from her. Weeks after she and Finneas were done with the songwriting, the Supreme Court decided to overturn Roe v. Wade, much to Eilish's horror.

Eilish embarked on a 2022–2023 world tour in support of Happier Than Ever, which began on February 3, 2022. During the tour's Manchester date, in June 2022, she debuted "TV" via a live performance with Finneas, who provided instrumentals via acoustic guitar. This marked the first time since around 2017 that she gave a preview of an unreleased song. Eilish commented in a cover story for NME that she had "missed doing a song that no-one had heard yet" during concert tours from those years. She added, "I just wanted to go back to my roots: to put a little guitar song back out."

Music and lyrics 

The extended play (EP) Guitar Songs consists of two melancholic ballads—"TV" and "The 30th"—that feature Eilish's soft vocals over an acoustic guitar. The production for both songs is reminiscent of her and Finneas's oldest works, created when they wanted to write songs at their parents' house with nothing but a guitar. Eilish explained their approach: "That's our roots... I wanted to go back and do it how we used to [make music]." Music journalists wrote that the EP was driven primarily by her vocal performances and her songwriting; its lyrics are personal, inspired primarily by her recent life experiences. As Laura Snapes for The Guardian explains, Guitar Songs showcases Eilish as she observes the destruction of several things in her life that she values dearly.   

"TV", the first song in the track list, discusses eating disorders, mental health, the defamation trial between actors Johnny Depp and Amber Heard, and the outcome of the Dobbs case. Its lyrics are about feelings of abandonment in a relationship and a desire for numbness as a distraction from the problems that plague the world. The song opens by describing a depressive episode: unable to sleep, Eilish distracts herself from a falling-out with an ex-partner by watching the reality TV show Survivor. In the chorus, she discusses the effects of her romantic relationships on the amount of time she can spend with her friends. By the second verse, Eilish laments the online attention that Depp v. Heard had received in comparison to the planned overturning of Roe v. Wade. To close the song, she uses a refrain. She repeats the phrase "maybe I'm the problem", blaming herself for the life issues she has faced while writing "TV".

"The 30th", according to Snapes, is a more personal song compared to "TV". Exploring themes of death and pain, it centers around a car accident that one of Eilish's friends experienced. She narrates how the friend went unconscious after the crash and recalled what happened to them when they woke up inside a travelling ambulance. In the chorus, Eilish sings about the friend's hospitalization and their feelings of fear during that time. When the song crescendos towards its bridge, its guitar chords slowly build up and the vocals begin to overlap, evoking a racing mind and a growing sense of panic. Eilish lists alternate scenarios that question if the friend would still be alive had the accident occurred at another day and in other locations. Closing the bridge, she says "if you changed anything, would you not have survived?" before she repeats the words "you're alive". On the last "you're alive", the vocal layering ends, leaving only Eilish's soft voice.

Release 

Darkroom and Interscope Records released Guitar Songs through digital download and streaming formats on July 21, 2022; the event happened without prior warning. "TV" and "The 30th" serve as the EP's double single. After its release, Eilish went on an interview with Zane Lowe for Apple Music 1. She revealed that between the release dates of Happier Than Ever and Guitar Songs, she and Finneas had written only the two tracks.

One topic of their conversation was Eilish's decision to surprise-release the EP. She told Lowe that even though she would record her third studio album soon, she refused to wait until that time to put "TV" and "The 30th" on a track list. After listening to voice memos of the songs months after making them, she knew she wanted to share their messages to her fans as soon as possible. Noting the immediacy of the lyrics, she said: "These songs are really current for me, and they’re songs that I want to have said right now." Another reason was Eilish had grown tired of doing heavy, traditional promotion for upcoming music. She wanted to release songs like she had been doing early in her career, previewing them for fans in live concerts before releasing them without much marketing.

Upon the EP's release, its tracks charted on multiple territories worldwide. In the US, "TV" and "The 30th" debuted at numbers 52 and 79 on the Billboard Hot 100, respectively. The two songs reached the top 40 of charts in Ireland, New Zealand, Australia, and the UK. In terms of international commercial performance, "TV" entered the Billboard Global 200 at number 25, and "The 30th" at number 50. After the release of Guitar Songs, Finneas reappeared on the Billboard Hot 100 Producers chart, making him the first person to spend 100 weeks there, and on Hot 100 Songwriters alongside Eilish. He debuted at numbers 16 and 23 on the two charts, respectively.

Nine days after the release, Eilish and Finneas visited the Amoeba Music record store in Hollywood to play "TV", along with three other songs, in commemoration of Happier Than Ever one-year anniversary. The two continued to perform "TV" during the world tour, including it in the set list of the Singapore stop. During the Manila concert, they did a live rendition of "The 30th" for the first time; Eilish felt it was hard to sing due to the personal lyrics. After the tour's Asian leg, Eilish and Finneas collaborated with Singapore's tourism board to film live performances of "TV" and "The 30th", set at the Gardens by the Bay. She shared the videos to her YouTube account on September 21, 2022.

Critical reception
During the week of the EP's release, Billboard held an online poll asking its readers to vote on their favorite new music. Guitar Songs topped the poll, chosen by 60% of the respondents. Prior to this, "TV" became a favorite among Eilish's fans following its debut in the Manchester concert. In a critic's review for The Guardian, Snapes gave Guitar Songs four stars out of five, thinking that its lyrics showcased Eilish's swift growth as a songwriter. Other music journalists were impressed by her vocal performances: Nylon Steffanee Wang deemed it "powerful", whereas Billboard Jason Lipshutz sensed improvement in her vocal technique and called it "increasingly confident". Jon Pareles of The New York Times described the EP as "modestly strummed, but richly produced".

Many critics praised Guitar Songs for the tracks' self-reflection and social commentary, some of whom considered it a testament to her writing talent. In particular, the Manila Bulletin entertainment columnists associated the EP's subject matter with the works of the greatest songwriters that came before her. They argued that its lyrics served as a reminder that she "remains one of the most treasured singer-songwriters of her generation". Snapes also commented on the lyrics in Guitar Songs, and she described its writing style as realist. She was impressed with Eilish's subtlety and ability to discuss poignant topics without downplaying their seriousness. For a similar reason, Consequence Mary Siroky selected "The 30th" as the best new song of the week ending July 22, 2022. She cited its vulnerable and relatable lyrics, directing praise towards the bridge in particular.

Track listing

Personnel 
Credits adapted from Tidal.

 Billie Eilishvocals, songwriting, engineering, vocal editing
 Finneas O'Connellsongwriting, production, engineering, vocal editing, bass, drums, guitar, piano, programming, synthesizer
 Dave Kutchmastering
 Rob Kinelskimixing
 Eli Heislerassistant mixing

References

Notes

Sources 

2022 EPs
Albums produced by Finneas O'Connell
Billie Eilish EPs
Interscope Records EPs